Each may refer to:
each, a determiner and indefinite pronoun in the English language
EACH, Educational Action Challenging Homophobia, a UK charitable organisation

See also
Every (disambiguation)
For each (disambiguation)